The lawn bowls competition at the 1982 Commonwealth Games took place in Brisbane, Australia from 30 September until 9 October 1982 at the Moorooka Bowls Club.

Willie Wood won the singles and Scotland doubled up in the pairs. Australia won the fours and Zimbabwe won the women's triples.

Medal table

Medallists

Results 
 Scotland won the Singles and Pairs with Australia winning the Fours. The debut of women's competition was with a Triples tournament.

Men's singles – round robin

Men's pairs – round robin

Men's fours – round robin

Women's triples – round robin

References

See also
List of Commonwealth Games medallists in lawn bowls
Lawn bowls at the Commonwealth Games

Lawn bowls at the Commonwealth Games
Commonwealth Games